William Grace (June 30, 1917 – November 18, 2006) was an American Negro league baseball outfielder and pitcher. He played from 1943 to 1948 with the Cleveland Buckeyes. He also played for the Erie Sailors of the Middle Atlantic League in 1951.

References

External links
 and Seamheads
Negro League Baseball Players Association page

1917 births
2006 deaths
Cleveland Buckeyes players
Erie Sailors players
Baseball players from Tennessee
People from Memphis, Tennessee
Baseball outfielders
20th-century African-American sportspeople
21st-century African-American people